Charles Ka-Ki Ng (born August 1, 1984) is a professional racing driver from Hong Kong.

Racing career

Early racing
Started racing at the late age of 24, Ng won the Asian Touring Car Championship in 2010 in his rookie season. Prior to that he won the 2008/09 Skip Barber MAZDASPEED Challenge West Championship, as well as being Rookie of the Year in the series and track record holder of the MX-5 Cup car.

Formula Drift
 Ng competed professionally in the Formula D Pro Championship drifting series in the United States, and took 2nd place for Rookie of the Year in 2010 with best finishes of top 8. In 2011, Ng drove for Evasive Motorsports and his best finish was a top 16.

Endurance Racing
In 2012, aside from World Touring Car Championship, Ng also competed in the VLN endurance championship at Nürburgring Nordschleife and he won the class at the 24 Hours of Zolder for Yokohama Belgium and Skylimitevents in a Porsche 996 GT3 Cup.

World Touring Car Championship

Engstler Motorsport (2011–2013)
Ng made his debut in the World Touring Car Championship at the 2011 FIA WTCC Race of Japan, driving a naturally aspirated BMW 320si for Liqui Moly Team Engstler. Ng then drove a turbocharged BMW 320 TC for the remaining rounds of the season and scored his first championship point on his first outing in race two of the Race of China. He finished the year 22nd in the drivers' standings.

In 2012, Ng drove full-time alongside Franz Engstler at the latter's BMW team. He had to be black flagged during the second free practice session for the Race of Spain after getting stuck in a gravel trap and then continuing after receiving assistance from the marshals. At the Race of Morocco, he was forced to retire due to a broken water pump belt when he was fighting for 11th place in race one. During race two of the Race of the United States, the rear bumper on Ng's car came loose when he was fighting for 11th place and he was issued with a black and orange flag ordering him to return to the pits for repairs. He ignored this and a black flag was put out, disqualifying him from the race. He picked up his first point of the season at the Race of China, finishing tenth in race one. Ng was classified 25th in the drivers' championship in his first full season.

Team Engstler continued to run Charles Ng alongside team owner Franz Engstler in the 2013 season. At the end of the season he was classified 18th in the driver's championship, his best finish in the series.

Racing record

Complete World Touring Car Championship results
(key) (Races in bold indicate pole position) (Races in italics indicate fastest lap)

References

External links

 Official site

Living people
1984 births
Hong Kong racing drivers
Drifting drivers
World Touring Car Championship drivers
Asian Touring Car Championship drivers
Formula D drivers
Engstler Motorsport drivers